Blues on Broadway is an album by the American musician Ruth Brown, released in 1989 through Fantasy Records. The album earned Brown a Grammy Award for Best Jazz Vocal Performance, Female. It was produced by Ralph Jungheim. Hank Crawford played saxophone on several tracks.

Critical reception

The Washington Post praised the "terrific remake of 'Good Morning Heartache'." The Chicago Tribune noted the "rich, wise voice shaped by hard-won experience and filled with deliciously wicked wit."

The Rolling Stone Album Guide wrote that "this is a woman who describes a life lived full measure every time she sings."

Track listing
"Nobody Knows When You're Down and Out" – 5:39
"Good Morning Heartache" – 5:59
"If I Can't Sell It, I'll Keep Sittin' on It" – 5:26
"Tain't Nobody's Biz-Ness If I Do" – 9:25
"St. Louis Blues" – 9:35
"Am I Blue" – 5:58
"I'm Just a Lucky So and So" – 5:54
"I Don't Break Dance" – 5:23 (bonus track on CD)
"Come Sunday" – 5:25  (bonus track on CD)

Personnel
Ruth Brown – vocals
Spanky Davis – trumpet
Hank Crawford – alto saxophone (except on 2,5,7,8)
Red Holloway – tenor saxophone
Britt Woodman – trombone
Bobby Forrester – leader, piano, Hammond B-3 organ
Rodney Jones – guitar, banjo
Al McKibbon – acoustic bass
Grady Tate – drums
George Horn – mastering

References

Ruth Brown albums
1989 albums
Fantasy Records albums
Grammy Award for Best Jazz Vocal Performance, Female